Jan Uddin is a British actor of Bangladeshi descent, now living in Los Angeles. He is best known for his lead roles in independent film Cliffs of Freedom (2019) and British thriller Lies We Tell (2017). Jan is the first person of Bangladeshi origin to star on Marvel Cinematic Universe and Netflix Original.

Early life
Uddin was born in Stoke on Trent, Staffordshire, England. His parents were of Bangladeshi origin.

Jan moved to London when 19 years old and then trained to become an actor at the Academy Drama School.

Career

Acting 
In 2007, acting roles included Casualty and short film Famous Last Words.

In 2008, he featured in the BBC soap opera EastEnders as Jalil Iqbal; a love interest for Shabnam Masood (Zahra Ahmadi.) His character first appeared on 17 March 2008 departing on 28 March 2008.

In 2009, Jan Uddin appeared in a film called Boogie Woogie alongside Gillian Anderson, Heather Graham and Amanda Seyfried.

In 2010, Uddin played Sweet Boy in Shank. The film is set in the future, around the survival of young adults during a food shortage.

In 2011, he starred in the French film Black Gold, directed by Jean-Jacques Annaud and starring Freida Pinto, Antonio Banderas and Mark Strong.

In 2017, Jan was cast as KD in Lies We Tell. His character "- brings some of the dark side to the film."

In 2019, Jan played Tariq in the independent drama Cliffs of Freedom directed by Van Ling and shot in New Mexico.

Filmography

Television

Film

See also
List of British actors
British Bangladeshi
List of British Bangladeshis

References

External links

Jan Uddin on Instagram
Jan Uddin interview with f-ACT Magazine

1985 births
Living people
English people of Bangladeshi descent
English male film actors
English male soap opera actors
English male actors of South Asian descent
English male models
Male actors from Birmingham, West Midlands
Alumni of the Academy Drama School